This is a list of public art in New Harmony, Indiana.

This list applies only to works of public art accessible in an outdoor public space. For example, this does not include artwork visible inside a museum.

Most of the works mentioned are sculptures. When this is not the case (i.e. sound installation, for example) it is stated next to the title.

New Harmony

References

New Harmony
New Harmony, Indiana
Tourist attractions in Posey County, Indiana
New Harmony, Indiana